A Masonic lodge, often termed a private lodge or constituent lodge, is the basic organisational unit of Freemasonry. It is also commonly used as a term for a building in which such a unit meets.  Every new lodge must be warranted or chartered by a Grand Lodge, but is subject to its direction only in enforcing the published constitution of the jurisdiction. By exception the three surviving lodges that formed the world's first known grand lodge in London (now merged into the United Grand Lodge of England) have the unique privilege to operate as time immemorial, i.e., without such warrant; only one other lodge operates without a warrant – the Grand Stewards' Lodge in London, although it is not also entitled to the "time immemorial" title. A Freemason is generally entitled to visit any lodge in any jurisdiction (i.e., under any Grand Lodge) in amity with his own. In some jurisdictions this privilege is restricted to Master Masons (that is, Freemasons who have attained the Order's third degree). He is first usually required to check, and certify, the regularity of the relationship of the Lodge – and be able to satisfy that Lodge of his regularity of membership. Freemasons gather together as a Lodge to work the three basic Degrees of Entered Apprentice, Fellowcraft, and Master Mason.

Masonic premises

Technically, Freemasons meet as a lodge, not in a lodge. In this context, the word "lodge" refers to a local chapter of Freemasons, meeting as a body. However, the term is often misused to refer to the buildings or rooms that Masons meet in. Masonic premises are also sometimes referred to as temples ("of Philosophy and the Arts"). In many countries Masonic centre or Masonic hall has now replaced these terms to avoid arousing prejudice and suspicion, or confusion with a religious building. Several different lodges, or other Masonic organizations, often use the same premises at different times.

Types
s, craft lodges or ancient craft lodges refer to the lodges that work the first three Masonic degrees, rather than the appendant Masonic orders such as York Rite and Scottish Rite. The term "craft lodge" is used in Great Britain. The blue lodge is said to refer to the traditional colour of regalia in lodges derived from English or Irish Freemasonry. Although the term was originally frowned upon, it has gained widespread and mainstream usage in America in recent times.

Research lodges have the purpose of furthering Masonic scholarship. Quatuor Coronati Lodge, in London, is an example of a research lodge; it has a strictly limited membership and receives visitors and papers from all over the world. Many jurisdictions have well-established research lodges, which usually meet less frequently than blue lodges and do not confer degrees.

In Great Britain, a lodge of instruction may be associated with a Lodge, but is not constituted separately.  The lodge of instruction provides the officers and those who wish to become officers an opportunity to rehearse ritual under the guidance of an experienced brother; there may also be lectures around the ritual and the symbolism in the lodge within a Lodge of Instruction, in order to develop the knowledge and understanding of the membership.

In some jurisdictions in the United States, the lodge of instruction serves as a warranted lodge for candidate instruction in other aspects of Freemasonry besides ritual rehearsal, as well as hosting a speaker on topics both Masonic and non-Masonic.

In Great Britain, the term  mother lodge is used to identify the particular Lodge where the individual was first "made a Mason" (i.e. received his Entered Apprentice degree). 'Mother lodge' may also refer to a lodge that sponsors the creation of a new lodge, the  daughter lodge, to be warranted under the jurisdiction of the same grand lodge; specific procedures pertaining to this vary throughout history and in different jurisdictions. Lodge Mother Kilwinning No 0 in the Grand Lodge of Scotland is known as the Mother Lodge of Scotland, having been referred to in the Schaw Statutes of 1598 and 1599, and having itself warranted other lodges at a time when it did not subscribe to a grand lodge.

The 21st century has seen the rise of internet virtual lodges that meet online rather than in person. Examples are the Internet Lodge No. 9659, Lodge Ireland, and Castle Island Virtual Lodge No. 190. The ability to hold remote lodge meetings allows those who are distant to continue to attend, whether they are military servicemen serving overseas or they inhabit a sparsely populated region.

Organization

Lodges are governed by national, state or provincial authorities, usually called Grand Lodges or Grand Orients, whose published constitutions define the structure of freemasonry under their authority, and which appoint Grand Officers from their senior masons. Provincial Grand Lodges (which in England generally correspond to historic counties) exercise an intermediate authority, and also appoint Provincial Grand Officers.

Different grand lodges and their regions show subtleties of tradition and variation in the degrees and practice; for example under the Grand Lodge of Scotland, the Mark Degree (which is unrecognised by the United Grand Lodge of England, but has a separate Mark Grand Lodge) is integrated into "The Craft" as a completion of the second degree. In any case, Grand Lodges have limited jurisdiction over their member Lodges, and where there is no prescribed ritual Lodges may thus have considerable freedom of practice. Despite these minor differences, fraternal relations exist between Lodges of corresponding degrees under different Grand Lodges.

Membership

Generally, to be accepted for initiation as a regular Freemason (in a lodge following Anglo-American style), a candidate must:
 Be a man
 Come of his own free will by his own initiative or by invitation in some jurisdictions.
 Believe in some kind of Supreme Being.
 Be of good morals, reputation and financially supporting himself and family.
 Be at least 21 years old (may be as young as 18 or as old as 25, depending on the jurisdiction).
 Live in the jurisdiction (under some Grand Lodges in the United States.)
 Be able to pass interviews and pass the Investigation Committee's inquiries about his past with people who have known him, which can take up to 2 years.
 Be of sound mind and body. (this is not a universal requirement).
 Be a "Free Man". This may have arisen from the refusal of operative masons to pass their secrets to slaves, who could be ordered to divulge them to others. It may also have arisen from a requirement of early speculative lodges that a new Freemason should at least have a licence to trade and employ others, making him a Free Man of the city or borough of the lodge.
 Pass the vote of the Lodge to allow his membership.
	 	
After a Lodge elects or approves a candidate in accordance with the requirements of its Grand Lodge, it will decide whether to give the candidate each degree in order. Generally speaking those who have only received the Entered Apprentice degree are considered Freemasons, but hold limited privileges until they attain the Master Mason degree; under UGLE only a Master Mason will receive a Grand Lodge certificate, which may be demanded by any other Lodge he wishes to visit.

A Master Mason is considered a full lifetime member of the Lodge where he received his degrees.  He can demit (resign) if he so desires but only if he is in good standing and his dues paid. A Mason might demit for personal reasons or to join another Lodge in those jurisdictions where multiple membership is not permitted.  After demitting, he continues to be regarded as a Mason in absentia and may rejoin through a new application, but he and his family have no rights, privileges or claims on Freemasonry.  Some sources (Mackey) claim that leaving the lodge does not exempt him from his obligations nor the wholesome control of the Order over his moral conduct. A Mason may be expelled from his Lodge and Freemasonry in general if convicted of particularly serious violations of Civil or Masonic law. Expulsion from all of Freemasonry can only occur from a Grand Lodge while lesser chapters can expel members from their specific lodges.

A Master Mason "in good standing" (i.e. whose dues are current and who is not subject to Masonic investigation or discipline) may join another regular Lodge; he need not take his degrees again, but may be expected to serve the new Lodge in office.

If a Master Mason is dropped from the rolls for non-payment of dues, under most circumstances he may be immediately reinstated in good standing simply by paying his current dues as well as any back dues owed, although in many jurisdictions there is a requirement to ballot for re-admission.

Many Grand Lodges permit Master Masons to be "plural affiliates," or members of more than one Lodge simultaneously. In some jurisdictions plural affiliates are prohibited from serving as an elected officer of more than one Lodge at any given time.

These rules are different for Freemasons of the Entered Apprentice and Fellowcraft Degrees. In some Grand Lodges an Entered Apprentice or Fellowcraft may not receive a demit, but may join another Lodge with the intent of earning the Master Mason Degree with the consent of his original Lodge.

Officers

The names, roles and numbers of Lodge officers vary widely from jurisdiction to jurisdiction. In most cases, there is an equivalent office in the Grand Lodge of the given jurisdiction, with the addition of the prefix 'Grand' to the title in question.

There are certain 'progressive' offices through which members move by a process of effective promotion, but also other more permanent offices, usually held by experienced members.

See also
 Grand Lodge
 Masonic music
 Masonic ritual and symbolism
 Research lodge

Notes

References

External links

Freemasonry